That’s Live is a live album by Eric Burdon and his band, recorded live in Karlsruhe, Germany, on 8 March 1985, during a European tour. It was originally marked Limited Compact Disc Reference Edition in 1985, and achieved more widespread release in 1992.

That’s Live is the only recording made of this line-up which, during the immediately prior period of 1981-84, had been one of the first Western rock acts to play extensively in the Eastern Bloc, including pre-unification East Germany, where, according to bassist Rob Burns, the band were "treated like royalty".

Track listing 

 "Intro" – 0:24
 "Don’t Let Me Be Misunderstood" (Bennie Benjamin, Gloria Caldwell, Sol Marcus) – 6:24
 "When I Was Young" (Eric Burdon, Vic Briggs, John Weider, Barry Jenkins, Danny McCulloch) – 7:41
 "Working Life" [aka "Factory"] (Bruce Springsteen), featuring Robbie Burns, bass – 10:40 
 "We Got To Get Out Of This Place" (Barry Mann, Cynthia Weil) – 10:20
 "Poor Man" (Woody Guthrie), featuring Tom Blades, guitar – 7:52 
 "River Deep, Mountain High" (Phil Spector) – 7:06
 "I‘m Crying" (Eric Burdon, Alan Price), featuring Mitch Harwood, drums – 10:09 
 "Lawdy Miss Clawdy" (Lloyd Price) – 8:50

Personnel

Performance 

 Eric Burdon - vocals
 Tom Blades - keyboard and guitar
 Rob Burns - bass
 Mitch Harwood - drums

Production 

Alex Manninger - executive producer, cutting consultant
Andre Ulmann - recording engineer 
Harald Hassler - technical assistant
Dr. Benjamin Bernfeld - cutting engineer
Günther Sümser - photos
Bruno Kassel - cover photo
wachner design/Freiberg - design
Sanyo Electric/Japan - manufacturer

References

External links 

Eric Burdon albums
1985 live albums